Herbert S. Klein (born January 6, 1936) is an American historian. He is the Gouveneur Morris Professor Emeritus of History at Columbia University.

In February 2020 the El Colegio de México awarded the Alfonso Reyes International Prize to Herbert S. Klein. He also received a Guggenheim Fellowship in 1980. In 2022, Klein served as the curator for the Latin American Collection of the Hoover Institute at Stanford University.

Bibliography
 Brazil, 1964-1985: The Military Regimes of Latin America in the Cold War. Yale University Press. 2017.

References

External links
 Website at Stanford
 Profile at Columbia University
 Bibliography at Amazon.com
 Publications at Academia edu
 Libguides of the donation of Dr. Herbert S. Klein at the CRAI campus Catalonia - URV

21st-century American historians
21st-century American male writers
1936 births
Living people
Latin Americanists
Historians of Latin America
Far Rockaway High School alumni
University of Chicago alumni
Brazilianists
Historians from New York (state)
American male non-fiction writers
Columbia University faculty